The Howard County Sheriff's Office (HCSO) is a law enforcement organization which acts as the enforcement arm of the Howard County court system and services Howard County, Maryland, population 328,200. Its mission centers around providing judicial enforcement and physical security for the Circuit Court. The department is a secondary law enforcement agency as police services are mostly provided by the larger, better-known Howard County Police Department while the county jail is run by the Howard County Department of Corrections. However, Sheriff's deputies are fully certified law enforcement officers with the same authority as any police officer in the state of Maryland. They assist county police officers with calls for service when requested or needed.

History

Anne Arundel County created the Howard District in 1831 from its Western half. Thomas Burgess acted as the Sheriff through the 1840s. In 1851, the Howard District became its own county with a dedicated Sheriff. The HCSO was created in 1851. Former Ellicott City Mayor E.A. Talbot served in 1856, George W. Howard served in 1908; Julius Wolsh Jr. in 1928; George D. Day Jr. in 1930; Norman O. Haward in 1962; Donald Edward Ansell in 1972.

Sheriff James F. Fitzgerald resigned in 2016 over allegations that he bullied his employees and made racist, sexist, and anti-Semitic remarks.

Organization
The Sheriff's Office is located at the Howard County Circuit Court building, 9250 Judicial Way, Ellicott City, Maryland. The current sheriff is Marcus Harris, a former Baltimore County Police detective, elected in November 2018. The HCSO is divided into six sections:

Domestic Violence Enforcement
Warrants/Fugitive
Courthouse Security
Landlord/Tenant
Transportation
Patrol Operations

Some of the Past Sheriffs

See also

 List of law enforcement agencies in Maryland

References

External links
Howard County Sheriff's Office official website

Howard County, Maryland
Organizations established in 1851
Sheriffs' offices of Maryland
1851 establishments in Maryland